The United States of America (USA), represented by the United States Olympic & Paralympic Committee, has participated in every Summer and Winter Paralympic Games and is currently first on the all-time medal table. The nation used to be a dominant Paralympic power in the 1960s, 1970s, and 1980s, but has steadily declined since the 1990s to a point where it finished sixth in the 2012 Summer Paralympics medal count. The team then improved to a fourth-place finish in 2016, and third in 2020, and unexpectedly finished first at the 2018 Winter Paralympics.

The United States was the co-host of the 1984 Summer Paralympics in Stoke Mandeville and New York. It also hosted the 1996 Summer Paralympics in Atlanta and 2002 Winter Paralympics in Salt Lake City.

Medal tables

Red border color indicates host nation status.

Medals by Summer Games

Medals by Winter Games

Medals by summer sport

The United States has never won a Paralympic medal in the following current summer sports or disciplines: badminton and football 5-a-side.

Medals by winter sport

The United States has never won a Paralympic medal in the following current winter sport: wheelchair curling.

Best results in non-medalling sports:

Flagbearers

Records

Summer Paralympics

Multi-medalists
Athletes who have won at least three gold medals or five medals at the Summer Paralympics. Bold athletes are athletes who are still active.

Multi-gold medalists at single Games
This is a list of athletes who have won at least two gold medals in a single Games. Ordered categorically by gold medals earned, sports, then year.

Multi-medalists at single event

This is a list of athletes who have won at least three medals in a single event at the Summer Paralympics. Ordered categorically by medals earned, sports, then gold medals earned.

Athletes with most appearances

Summer Paralympics

This is a list of athletes who have competed in four or more Summer Paralympics. Active athletes are in bold. Athletes under 15 years of age and over 40 years of age are in bold.

Winter Paralympics

See also
 United States at the Olympics

References